In Jainism, a Bhonyra is an underground chamber with Jain images. In the past, it was used to conceal sacred idols during times of disturbance.

There are several Jain temples in Bundelkhand that existed as a concealed  bhonyra chamber for several centuries before being rediscovered. 

In 2001, an entire Jain temple was found beneath a mound known as Rajgadhi Timbo at Umta, Gujarat. It was apparently buried to protect it from the destruction about 800 years ago.

In some regions, it became a common practice to build a bhonyra attached to the temple. Naya Mandir in Delhi has a concealed chamber. A visitor in 1876 described it:In Delhi I found a Jain temple which was wholly unknown to Europeans well acquainted with the city; and on prosecuting inquiry, I got its priest to open to me a concealed chamber containing large statues of several of the Tirthankaras richly ornamented.The chamber has now been given the form of a cave, suitable for peaceful meditation by visiting Jain monks.

A few years ago, several Jain idols were rediscovered in a bhonyara in Sanghiji temple, Sanganer in Rajasthan.

Some of the Jain temples in Ahmedabad have an underground chamber.

See also
Raja Harsukh Rai
 Jainism in Delhi
 Sanganer
 Hansi
 Chausa hoard

References
 

Buildings and structures in Delhi
Indian architectural history
Jain architecture